Nawabagh is the notified area and village in Ganderbal district in the Indian union territory of Jammu and Kashmir. The place is famous for the production of apples, cherries, peaches, apricots, walnuts, and pears, which are exported all over India. The varieties of apples that grow in the area include the American apple, Delicious, Golden, Kullu Delicious, Amur, Red Gold, Razak Wari and Maharaji. The postal code of the area is 193501.

Geography
The area is located about 1619 m above mean sea level in Mumbai. The nearby villages of the area include Wakura, Batwina, Zazna, Badampora, Khanpura, Manasbal, Waskura, Ahan, Kharbagh and Gazhuma.

Demographics
There are about 85 families residing in the village with the population of touching 800. Kashmiri is the native language of the people residing in the area and people also use Hindi/Urdu and English.

Education
Sheikh ul Aalam Public School (non-functional)
Government Middle School, Nawabagh
Government Unani Medical College (Now Functional - edited By Dr Junaid Nazir Dandroo Assistant Professor Anatomy)

See also
Kangan

References

Villages in Ganderbal district
Kashmir